Lisette van de Ven (born 7 August 1969) is a Dutch beach volleyball player. She competed in the women's tournament at the 1996 Summer Olympics.

References

External links
Newspaper articles of Van der Ven via Delpher

1969 births
Living people
Dutch women's beach volleyball players
Olympic beach volleyball players of the Netherlands
Beach volleyball players at the 1996 Summer Olympics
Sportspeople from Deventer